Gray Matter Inc. was a Canadian video game developer based in Oakville, Ontario. It was established by Chris Gray in 1985 and disbanded in 1997.

History 
Gray Matter was founded by Chris Gray in Oakville, Ontario in 1985. At its peak in 1995, the studio had approximately 75 employees. Gray wound down the company in 1997 due to a lack of funding.

Games developed

Chris Gray Enterprises Inc.

Gray Matter Inc.

References

External links 
 

1985 establishments in Ontario
1997 disestablishments in Ontario
Canadian companies disestablished in 1997
Canadian companies established in 1985
Defunct video game companies of Canada
Video game companies disestablished in 1997
Video game companies established in 1985
Video game development companies